Regional elections were held in Denmark on 4 March 1958.  11529 municipal council members were elected, as well as 303 members of the amts of Denmark.

Results of regional elections
The results of the regional elections:

Amt Councils

Municipal Councils

References

1958
Denmark
Elections
Danish local elections